Bhumahi is a small town of Ramnagar Village Development Committee in Nawalparasi District in the Lumbini Zone of southern Nepal. Mahendra highway (East West highway) goes through the middle;  connects Butwal in west, Prasai and Bhairahawa in South and Narayanghat in East. It is one of the fastest growing town in the area.

References

Populated places in Parasi District